Cardaillac is a commune in the Lot department in south-western France.

The village is located on the edge of the Limargue—a rich agricultural region—and Ségala, a poor rye-and chestnut-producing region. It has a rich medieval history and has been officially listed as one of the "most beautiful French villages".

A stronghold was built on a rocky promontory above Cardaillac from 1064 at the orders of Hugo, Lord of Cardaillac. Today only three towers remain, dating from the thirteenth century. In 1188 it was attacked by Richard the Lionheart soon before his accession to the throne.

On 11 May 1944, three youths were executed by the "Das Reich" division, which subsequently massacred the population of Oradour-sur-Glane.

Bibliography
 Des blasons pour le Hérisson Laure and Jean-Luc Angélis, Téqui éditions, .

See also
Communes of the Lot department

References

External links

 Cardaillac, a history
 Cardaillac in Les plus beaux villages de France

Communes of Lot (department)
Plus Beaux Villages de France